South West Hertfordshire is a constituency in the House of Commons of the UK Parliament, represented since 2019 by Gagan Mohindra, a Conservative.

Constituency profile 
Elevated and bordering Greater London and Buckinghamshire, this part of Hertfordshire is for its residents mostly middle-class suburbia, an established haven for commuters who travel from the outer reaches of the London Underground's Metropolitan line or two railways from London which serve different parts of the seat: the West Coast Main Line and Aylesbury Line.  A substantial proportion of land is occupied by farms and hillside woodland.

Workless claimants were in November 2012 significantly lower than the national average of 3.8%, at 1.6% of the population based on a statistical compilation by The Guardian.

It is estimated that 51% of the seat voted Remain in the 2016 EU referendum.

Boundaries and boundary changes

1950–1974: The Urban Districts of Bushey, Chorleywood, and Rickmansworth, and the Rural District of Watford.

The constituency was formed from the former Watford Division of Hertfordshire, excluding the part comprising the Municipal Borough of Watford.  Also included the parishes of Abbots Langley and Sarratt, transferred from Hemel Hempstead.

1974–1983: The Urban Districts of Bushey, Chorleywood, and Rickmansworth, and in the Rural District of Watford the civil parishes of Abbots Langley, Sarratt, and Watford Rural.

The parish of Aldenham in the Rural District of Watford was transferred to the new County Constituency of South Hertfordshire.

1983–1997: The District of Three Rivers wards of Ashridge, Bedmond, Carpenders Park, Chorleywood, Chorleywood West, Croxley Green, Croxley Green North, Croxley Green South, Hayling, Langleybury, Maple Cross and West Hyde, Mill End, Money Hill, Moor Park, Northwick, Oxhey Hall, Rickmansworth, and Sarratt, and the District of Dacorum wards of Berkhamsted Central, Berkhamsted East, Berkhamsted West, Bovingdon and Flaunden, Chipperfield, Kings Langley, and Northchurch.

The parts of the District of Dacorum, including Berkhamsted, were transferred from the abolished County Constituency of Hemel Hempstead.  Abbots Langley was transferred to Watford and Bushey to the new County Constituency of Hertsmere.

1997–2010: The District of Three Rivers wards of Ashridge, Chorleywood, Chorleywood West, Croxley Green, Croxley Green North, Croxley Green South, Hayling, Maple Cross and West Hyde, Mill End, Money Hill, Moor Park, Northwick, Rickmansworth, and Sarratt, and the District of Dacorum wards of Aldbury and Wigginton, Berkhamsted Central, Berkhamsted East, Berkhamsted West, Bovingdon and Flaunden, Chipperfield, Northchurch, Tring Central, Tring East, and Tring West.

Gained Tring from the abolished County Constituency of West Hertfordshire.  Kings Langley transferred to the re-established County Constituency of Hemel Hempstead, Bedmond to St Albans, and three wards in the Three Rivers District to Watford.

2010–present: The District of Three Rivers wards of Ashridge, Chorleywood East, Chorleywood West, Croxley Green, Croxley Green North, Croxley Green South, Hayling, Maple Cross and Mill End, Moor Park and Eastbury, Northwick, Penn, Rickmansworth, Rickmansworth West, and Sarratt, and the District of Dacorum wards of Aldbury and Wigginton, Berkhamsted Castle, Berkhamsted East, Berkhamsted West, Bovingdon, Flaunden and Chipperfield, Northchurch, Tring Central, Tring East, and Tring West.

Minor gain from Hemel Hempstead following revision of local authority wards.

This seat forms a thin strip along the south-west border of Hertfordshire from South Oxhey in the south, through interspersed settlements and countryside to Tring in the north. Settlements in the constituency include Berkhamsted, Chipperfield, Chorleywood, Croxley Green, Moor Park, Sarratt and Rickmansworth.

Members of Parliament

Elections

Elections in the 2010s

Elections in the 2000s

Elections in the 1990s

Elections in the 1980s

Elections in the 1970s

 Note: ACMFT stands for the Anti Common Market and Free Trade Party.
 Resignation of Dodsworth 24 October 1979

Elections in the 1960s

Elections in the 1950s

See also
 List of parliamentary constituencies in Hertfordshire
 1979 South West Hertfordshire by-election

Notes

References

Parliamentary constituencies in Hertfordshire
Constituencies of the Parliament of the United Kingdom established in 1950
Politics of Three Rivers District
Politics of Dacorum